Cacostola nelsoni is a species of beetle in the family Cerambycidae. It was described by Chemsak and Linsley in 1986. It is known from Mexico.

References

Cacostola
Beetles described in 1986